Pete Fowler (born 1969 in Cardiff) is a Welsh artist best known for his artwork for the Welsh band Super Furry Animals and his Monsterism toys and goods. He is a freelance illustrator and "monster maker" inspired by animals, music, folklore, myths, psychedelia and super nature. He has also worked on a number of other projects in the UK and Japan, such as television advertisements (Kia Picanto), as well as having art exhibitions in the UK and abroad.

Monsterism 
The majority of Fowler's art is made in a postmodern cartoon style and often revolves around a central narrative and features a recurring set of characters. The "monsters" Fowler creates all reside on "Monsterism Island". Fowler invents extensive back-stories for his characters; each has its own specific traits and levels of "monsterism". Fowler is most known for his designer toys of his characters, which he himself manufactures with his own company. 
 
A CD called The Sounds of Monsterism Island was released in 2005 by Heavenly Records. According to the press release, "The record is a compilation album that works as a soundtrack to the world of Monsterism. The album features psychedelic music from the '60s through to today, much of it unearthed and put on CD for the first time." In 2006, Fowler created a set of comics about Monsterism Island which have been featured in Vice Magazine. The second soundtrack to Monsterism Island, A Psychedelic Guide to Monsterism Island, was released in 2009 and features mostly new compositions by a host of contemporary musicians.

Notable events 
Fowler is one half of the deckshoegaze/cosmic disco outfit Seahawks who have released extensively on vinyl, CD and download since 2010 and have remixed a variety of bands as well as regularly DJing, with Fowler commonly playing the genres of 70's smooth rock, discoid and balearic debris.

References

External links
 Pete Fowler's official website
 Pete Fowler flickr
 Seahawks

1969 births
Living people
Welsh illustrators
Artists from Cardiff
Album-cover and concert-poster artists